Don Albert & Partners is an architectural firm founded by Don Albert.

Background 
Don Albert (born 22 February 1971 in Port Shepstone, South Africa) is a South African born architect. He was schooled at Treverton College and received a Bachelor of Architecture (1993) and a Post Graduate Diploma in Architecture (1994) at the University of KwaZulu-Natal, South Africa. In 1996 Don was awarded a Fulbright Scholarship to complete his masters at the University of California, Los Angeles. After graduation he spent another year as design associate at the office of AIA Gold Medallist (Los Angeles) Barton Myers, Beverly Hills.

Prior to attending UCLA, Albert founded his own architectural design firm, soundspacedesign (since rebranded as Don Albert & Partners) to practice in South Africa.  In 1997 he was awarded first prize and the commission to design the Barrows building in Durban. This competition entry was submitted and realised from Los Angeles via the internet, an innovation at the time, and heralded a new mode of “integrated” non-hierarchical work space for post-apartheid industry.

In February 2000 Don Albert and Alex Pienaar won the National Ports Authority's Millennium Tower architectural competition for the port control tower in the city of Durban. The Millennium Tower won a SAICE Award for Best Civil Engineering Project in 2004.

Don Albert represents one of the few architects in South Africa who is practising in a unique design philosophy that combines digital design methodology with metaphorical considerations.   Don Albert's High Performan Centre at the University of Pretoria and the Barrows factory are renowned in South Africa, and abroad, as ground-breaking typologies. These projects have been published in Japan, Italy, China, UK, South Africa, and Brazil.

Don Albert was the second youngest architect to be featured in Phaidon World Atlas of Contemporary architecture.

Quotes
"Challenging modernism’s restrictive spatial practices, Don Albert & Partners suggest a more reflectively produced location for architectural production." Iain Low, Editor, DIGEST of South African Architecture.

"We were introduced to the work of a young and very capable architect who appears to think logically, clearly and creatively, combining vibrant, sleek administrative spaces with practical ideas. I salute this young designer who convinces owners of industrial premises to transform their work-horse buildings into sculptural elements, when these could so easily have been the usual unimaginative industrial complexes." – Deborah Preller, former President of the Cape Institute for Architecture (CIFA) and member of the 2007 judging panel for KZ-NIA Awards

"It was in America, and to some degree in Japan, that I learned that architecture is about space and proportion, not about eye-catching details. The details enable space to exist, that’s all. Buildings should invoke the enlightenment of their users and play a part much bigger than their own immediate, self-referential materiality. It’s about the user, not the object." Don Albert, as quoted in The Property Magazine.

"Throughout much of the work of Don Albert & Partners, metaphors and analogies are used to invigorate the design outcomes, and this is especially so in the design process itself. Thus metaphors simply hold and delay the reductive output that modernism and its rational planning demands." Nic Coetzer (PhD) – Senior Lecturer, University of  Cape Town

Gallery

Projects

 DESIGN INDABA 10x10 HOUSING With Tom Dixon – 2008
 PROUD HERITAGE CLOTHING CAMPUS – 2006 (SAIA Merit Award Winner)
 PROUD HERITAGE WAREHOUSE 2 – 2006 (SAIA Merit Award Winner)
 KINGS PARK ICONIC STADIUM – 2006 (Invited Competition Entry & Finalist)
 MILLENNIUM TOWER – 2002 (Winning Competition Entry)
 HIGH PERFORMANCE CENTRE – University of Pretoria 2001
 BARROWS POINT OF PURCHASE – 1998 (Winning Competition Entry)

Selected honours and awards 

 SAICE 2004 Award for Best Civil Engineering Project, Durban – Millennium Tower, Durban
 SAISC 2006 Award for the Best Steel Construction in the Architectural Category for the Proud Heritage Clothing Campus, Durban
 SAIA 2007 Merit Award for Proud Heritage Clothing Campus, Durban
 KZNIA 2007 Award for Proud Heritage Clothing Campus, Durban

References

Further reading
 Sound Space Design: The Architecture of Don Albert & Partners'' – (Cape Town: Pythagoras) 2010

External links 
 Don Albert & Partners Website
 Sound Space Design Website
 PHAIDON WORLD ATLAS of 21st ARCHITECTURE
 CONTEMPORARY SOUTH AFRICAN ARCHITECTURE in a landscape of transition – (Cape Town: Double Storey)
 DIGEST OF SOUTH AFRICAN ARCHITECTURE
 10 YEARS + 100 BUILDINGS: Architecture in a Democratic South Africa – (Cape Town: Bell Roberts) 2009
 THE PROPERTY MAGAZINE – FEATURE

Architecture firms of South Africa